Philippe Bergé (born 20 June 1971 in Brive-la-Gaillarde) is a French former motorcycle speedway rider, who competed in Grasstrack, Longtrack and Speedway. He is a former champion of France.

Speedway career
Bergé came to prominence when he reached the final of the 1993 Individual Long Track World Championship, he then reached a second longtrack final the following year. He began his British league career riding for Oxford Cheetahs during the 1996 Premier League speedway season, he was signed midway through the season but still rode 14 times for the club. 

In 1996, he became the champion of France and competed in his third world longtrack final at the 1996 Individual Long Track World Championship and had showed enough good form during 1996 to be retained by the Cheetahs for the 1997 Premier League speedway season, where he rode 35 times and averaged above 8 and recorded a maximum score in the second leg of the Premier League Knockout Cup final. He also finished in 7th place during the 1997 Individual Long Track World Championship.

He left Oxford for the Isle of Wight Islanders following Oxford's move to the Elite League and also rode a few matches for Swindon Robins before switching to Peterborough Panthers, who he helped win the league and reach the Knockout Cup final.

He competed in the 1998 Individual Long Track World Championship and reached his third European Grasstrack final in 1999.

Major results

World Individual Longtrack Championship
 1993 Individual Long Track World Championship 18th, 2pts
 1995 Individual Long Track World Championship 12th, 5pts
 1996 Individual Long Track World Championship 11th, 6pts
 1997 Individual Long Track World Championship 7th, 64pts
 1998 Individual Long Track World Championship 21st, 11pts

Family
His son Dimitri Bergé is also an international speedway rider.

References

1971 births
Living people
French speedway riders
French motorcycle racers
Isle of Wight Islanders riders
Oxford Cheetahs riders
Peterborough Panthers riders
Swindon Robins riders
Individual Speedway Long Track World Championship riders